Mark Hobson may refer to:

 Mark Hobson (boxer) (born 1976), British former professional boxer
 Mark Hobson (spree killer) (born 1969), British spree killer